This is a list of properties and districts in Laurens County, Georgia that are listed on the National Register of Historic Places (NRHP).

Current listings

|}

References

Laurens
Buildings and structures in Laurens County, Georgia